The 2018 Girls' Youth South American Volleyball Championship was the 21st edition of the Girls' Youth South American Volleyball Championship, organised by South America's governing volleyball body, the Confederación Sudamericana de Voleibol (CSV). The tournament will be held in Valledupar, Colombia from 8 to 12 July 2018.

A total of eight teams played in the tournament, with players born on or after 1 January 2002 eligible to participate.

Same as previous editions, the tournament acted as the CSV qualifiers for the FIVB Volleyball Girls' U18 World Championship. The top three teams qualified for the 2019 FIVB Volleyball Girls' U18 World Championship as the CSV representatives.

Competing nations
The following national teams participated:

Preliminary round
All times are local (UTC−5).

Pool A

Pool B

Final rounds

5–8th-place classification

5–8th semifinals

Seventh-place match

Fifth-place match

Championship

Semifinals

Third-place match

Final

Final standing

All-Star Team

Most Valuable Player

Best Outside Hitters

Best Setter

Best Middle Blockers

Best Opposite

Best Libero

References

2018
Girls
Girls
Volleyball
International volleyball competitions hosted by Colombia
Volleyball